Apasmara is a dwarf who represents spiritual ignorance and nonsensical speech in Hindu mythology. He is also known as Muyalaka or Muyalakan.

Etymology and medical application of name
The suffix smāra (from smaranam – 'utterances' or 'memorization') signifies 'memory', not 'speech'. The compound apasmāra means 'loss of memory/dementia/amnesia', 'gibberish', that is, nonsensical or unintelligible speech or ego (Ahamkara). The Ayurvedic disease concept 'Apasmāra' (see below) referred to certain neurological disorders having such memory loss (not speech) as a symptom, but, given the absence, at the time, of such modern adjuncts to diagnosis as brain-scanning, it is hard now to determine with any exactitude what all these may have been.

Hinduism 

To preserve knowledge in the world, Apasmāra must be subdued, not killed, as to do so would disturb the necessary balance between spiritual knowledge and ignorance. Killing Apasmāra would symbolise the attainment of knowledge without the (essential) effort, dedication and hard work involved, and this would lead to the devaluing of knowledge in all its forms.  To subdue Apasmāra, Shiva adopted the form of Nataraja – the Lord of Dance – and performed the cosmic dance of tāṇḍava. During this dance, Nataraja suppressed Apasmāra by crushing him with his right foot. As Apasmāra is one of the few demons destined to immortality, it is believed that Lord Shiva forever remains in his Nataraja form suppressing Apasmāra for eternity.

Nataraja's right foot is planted squarely on a horrible little subhuman creature - the demon, Muyalaka. A dwarf, but immensely powerful in his malignity, Muyalaka is the embodiment of ignorance, the manifestation of greedy, possessive selfhood. Stamp on him, break his back! And that's precisely what Nataraja is doing. Trampling the little monster down under his right foot. But notice that it isn't at this trampling foot that he points his finger; it's at the left foot, the foot that, as he dances, he's in the act of raising from the ground. And why does he point at it? Why? That lifted foot, that dancing defiance of the force of gravity - it's the symbol of release, of moksha, of liberation.

This mythological dwarf is generally depicted with his hand in the Añjali Mudrā. He is often depicted in this posture in depictions of Naṭarāja.

Disease concept in Ayurveda
The concept of Apasmāra in Āyurveda relates to a group of neurological disorders, one of which may be identified as epilepsy:<ref>[http://easyayurveda.com/2014/04/23/epilepsy-ayurvedic-understanding-treatment/ M.S. Krishnamurthy, Epilepsy - Ayurvedic Understanding and its Treatment''']</ref> according to Maharṣi Caraka, there are 4 types of apasmāra. These 4 types of apasmara are Vataja, Pitaja, Kapahaja and Sannipataja.These can be related to conditions associated with loss of memory like amnesia and dementia or temporal lobe epilepsy with fugue states or hysteria. Charakhas instituted this classification depending upon the different doshas of the body.

Usage in Indian astronomical symbolism
Recent work by Rupa Bhaty analysing the symbolism of the Natarāja icon of Śiva has revealed the presence of imagery relating not only to the mythology and iconography of expanded consciousness, but also to astronomy. Bhaty interprets the demon Apasmāra, in his astronomical form as the constellation Lepus (Indian Muyala - likewise a rabbit or hare), as representing forgetfulness, specifically forgetfulness concerning the star Canopus (equated in India with the sage Agastya), with Apasmāra / Muyala'' representing / standing in for Agastya when the latter is not visible in India at certain latitudes; and possibly also forgetfulness of a deluge coinciding with a supernova event commemorated in certain South Indian festivals (celebrated at the New Year / March equinox) in honour of lord Śiva. The lunar associations of the hare in many cultures likewise tally with the association of Apasmāra and his constellation Lepus with pathological mental states though the concept of lunacy (i.e. 'moon madness'). Bhaty asserts that Rudra, the hunter (compare Orion (mythology)), and Apasmāra are to be equated with  the constellations Kootu and Muyalaka, which were used by the navigators of Malabar and are identifiable with the western constellations Orion the Hunter, and  Lepus, the Hare.

Śiva / Rudra / Orion  (as Natarāja - 'Lord of the Dance'), by treading Apasmāra underfoot, delivers Agastya from the clutches of ignorance, by keeping track of the rising of Agastya-Canopus in the night skies of Springtime, as viewed on the horizon at different latitudes on the Indian peninsula.

See also
 Ātman (Hinduism)
 Hindu philosophy
 Mysticism
 Temporal lobe epilepsy
 Geschwind syndrome

References

Sources
Dictionary of Hindu Lore and Legend by Anna Dallapiccola

Characters in Hindu mythology